"Take It Back" is a song by English DJ and producer Toddla T, released on 30 March 2011 as the first single from his second studio album Watch Me Dance. The song features guest vocal contributions by Shola Ama and J2K. It reached No. 59 on the UK Singles Chart.

Music video
A music video for the song was uploaded to YouTube on 24 May 2011.

Track listing

Chart performance

Release history

References

External links
Toddla T Essential Mix

2011 songs
2011 singles
UK garage songs
Ninja Tune singles